Ewa Radzikowska (born 23 November 1979) is a former professional tennis player from Poland.

Biography
Radzikowska featured mostly in local ITF tournaments, with her only title coming at Toruń in 1996, beating Alina Tecșor in the final. She reached a best singles ranking of 361 in the world.

Most notably she featured in three Fed Cup ties in 1996 for Poland, which were competing in the Europe/Africa Zone. Partnering with Magdalena Mróz, she won her first two doubles matches for Poland without dropping a game, against African opponents. Her only singles match came in a tie against Denmark, which she lost to Sandra Olsen in three sets.

Following her career in professional tennis she played at college level at Oklahoma State University and continues to live in the United States.

ITF finals

Singles: (1-2)

See also
List of Poland Fed Cup team representatives

References

External links
 
 
 

1979 births
Living people
Polish female tennis players
Oklahoma State Cowgirls tennis players
20th-century Polish women